The following are the association football events of the year 2007 throughout the world.

News

January
 1 – The 74th traditional new year match between the Koninklijke HFC and the former Dutch international players ends in a 3–1 win for Oranje that won the confrontation for the fourth consecutive time. The Oranje goals were scored by Aron Winter, Rob Witschge and Orlando Trustfull.
 11 – David Beckham signs a 5-year deal with MLS team Los Angeles Galaxy.
 20 – The first Argentine major rivalry of the year was played between River Plate and Boca Juniors in Mar del Plata. The match ended in a 2–0 score in favor of River Plate.

February
 18 – Season premiers Melbourne Victory win the second A-League football (soccer) grand final at Telstra Dome in Melbourne, Australia beating Adelaide United 6–0, with Victory striker Archie Thompson scoring 5 goals.
 19 – Reigning League of Ireland champions Shelbourne relegated by the Football Association of Ireland before the start of the new 2007 season.
 25- Chelsea won the Football League Cup previously known as League Cup after beating Arsenal 2–1 at the Millennium Stadium

March
 18 – Hibernian win the Scottish League Cup (Scottish League Cup) final.

April
 21 – Lyon become the first club in the "top five" European leagues to win six consecutive Championships after securing the Ligue 1 title with six games to play.
 22 – Internazionale secure their fifteenth Serie A title after defeating Siena whilst championship rivals Roma lose to Atalanta.
 22 – Celtic defeat Kilmarnock to retain their Scottish Premier League title.
 29 – PSV claim the Eredivisie title, their third in a row after the three teams: AZ, Ajax, and PSV had 72 points each. PSV pipped to the title Ajax on goal difference.

May
 6 – Defending champions Chelsea lose the English Premiership title to Manchester United after a draw with Arsenal at Emirates Stadium.
 16 – Sevilla become the first team since 1986 to win two consecutive UEFA Cups after beating Espanyol at Hampden Park, Scotland.
 17 – Roma win its eighth Coppa Italia, winning the two final matches with an aggregate result of 7–3 against Internazionale. (6–2 in the first leg played in Rome, 2–1 in the second one in Milan)
 19 – Chelsea beat Manchester United  in the FA Cup Final 2007. Didier Drogba scored an extra time goal to secure a 1–0 victory and a domestic Cup Double for Chelsea.
 19 – Stuttgart win the 2007 Bundesliga in Germany.
 23 – Milan win their seventh UEFA Champions League title after beating Liverpool 2-1

June
 10 – San Lorenzo de Almagro won their 13th Argentine Primera title beating Arsenal de Sarandí 4–2 at the Nuevo Gasómetro
 17 – Real Madrid  won their 30th Spanish Primera Liga title after defeating Mallorca 3–1 at Santiago Bernabéu Stadium.
 20 – Boca Juniors won their sixth Copa Libertadores title after defeating Grêmio. They beat the Brazilian side by 3–0 at home and 2–0 at the Estádio Olímpico.
 24 – USA won their 4th title of CONCACAF Gold Cup beating Mexico 2–1.
 26 – Poland's Lower Silesia wins the fifth UEFA Regions' Cup, beating Bulgaria's South-East Region 2–1, after extra time, in Sliven.

July
 29 – Iraq produced one of football's greatest fairytale victories as the fractured, war-torn nation were crowned champions of the AFC Asian Cup for the first time.

August
 5 – Manchester United won the Community Shield for their 16th time (shared 4 times), beating Chelsea 3–0 on penalties after a 1–1 draw.
 31 – Milan win the 2007 UEFA Super Cup beating Sevilla to claim their 17th international title.

December
 2 – Club Atlético Lanús won their first Argentine Primera by obtaining a 1–1 draw against Boca Juniors in the Bombonera.
 5 – Argentine club Arsenal de Sarandí won the first major title in their history beating Club América of Mexico in the final of Copa Sudamericana 2007.
 5 – Honduran club Motagua obtained its first international cup in their history beating Saprissa of Costa Rica in the final of Copa Interclubes UNCAF 2007.
 16 – Milan beat Boca Juniors 4–2 in the 2007 FIFA Club World Cup final to overhaul Boca's world record 17 international titles.

International tournaments
 : 
 : 
 :  and 
2007 UEFA European Under-21 Football Championship IN (June 10 – 23 2007)
 : 
 : 
 :  and 
 : 
 : 
 : 
 4th: 
 : 
 : 
 : 
 : 
 : 
 4th: 
 : 
 : 
 : 
 4th: 
 : 
 : 
 : 
 4th: 
 : 
 : 
 : 
 4th:

National champions

UEFA nations

: KF Tirana
: FC Rànger's
: FC Pyunik
: Red Bull Salzburg
: Khazar Lenkoran
: BATE Borisov
: Anderlecht
: FK Sarajevo
: Levski Sofia
: Dinamo Zagreb
: APOEL
: Sparta Prague
: Copenhagen
: Manchester United
: Levadia Tallinn
: NSÍ
: Tampere United
: Lyon
: Olimpi Rustavi
: Stuttgart
: Olympiacos
: Debreceni VSC
: Valur
: Drogheda United
: Beitar Jerusalem
: Inter Milan
: FC Aktobe
: FK Ventspils
: FBK Kaunas
: F91 Dudelange
: Pobeda
: Marsaxlokk
: Sheriff Tiraspol
: FK Zeta (first First League champions)
: PSV
: Linfield
: SK Brann
: Zagłębie Lubin
: Porto
: Dinamo București
: Zenit St. Petersburg
: S.S. Murata
: Celtic
: Red Star Belgrade
: MŠK Žilina
: Domžale
: Real Madrid
: IFK Göteborg
: FC Zürich
: Fenerbahçe
: Dynamo Kyiv
: The New Saints

CONMEBOL nations
A = Apertura, C = Clausura

: San Lorenzo (C),  Lanús (A)
: Real Potosí (A), San José (C)
: São Paulo
: Colo-Colo (A & C)
: Atlético Nacional (A & C)
: LDU Quito
: Club Libertad
: Universidad San Martín
: Danubio
: Caracas FC

CONCACAF nations
A = Apertura, C = Clausura

: Kicks United
: Bassa
: Deportivo Nacional
:
: Barbados Defence Force
: FC Belize
: Devonshire Cougars
:
: Toronto Croatia 1
: Scholars International
: N/A 2
: Deportivo Saprissa (C)
: Sagicor South East United
:
: A.D. Isidro Metapán (C), Firpo (A)
Grenada: ASOMS Paradise
: Xelajú MC (C), Deportivo Jalapa (A)
:
:
: Real España (C), Marathón (A)
: Harbour View
: Pachuca (C), Atlante (A)
:
Netherlands Antilles: SV Centro SD Barber
: Real Estelí
: Tauro (A), San Francisco (C)
: Fraigcomar
: Newtown United
: Anse Chastanet GYSO
: Under-20
: Inter Moengotapoe
: San Juan Jabloteh
: Beaches
: Houston Dynamo (MLS)
: Helenites

1 Excludes Canadian clubs playing in the MLS.

2 There was no national champion in Cuba during 2007 as the Campeonato Nacional is in the process of changing from being a summer league to a winter league; the 2006 champion will be followed by a 2007–08 champion.

CAF nations

Algeria: ES Sétif
Angola: Inter Luanda
Benin: Tonnerre d'Abomey
Botswana: ECCO City Green
Burkina Faso: Commune
Burundi: Vital'O
Cameroon: Cotonsport Garoua
Cape Verde: Sporting Praia
Central African Republic:
Chad:
Comoros: Coin Nord
Congo: Diables Noirs
Côte d'Ivoire: Africa Sports
DR Congo: TP Mazembe
Djibouti: AS Compagnie Djibouti-Ethiopie
Egypt: Al-Ahly
Equatorial Guinea: Renacimiento
Eritrea:
Ethiopia: Awassa City
Gabon: FC 105 Libreville
Gambia: Real de Banjul
Ghana: Hearts of Oak
Guinea: Kaloum Star
Guinea-Bissau: Sporting de Bissau
Kenya: Tusker
Lesotho: Lesotho Correctional Services
Liberia: Invincible Eleven
Libya: Al-Ittihad
Madagascar: Ajesaia
Malawi:
Mali: Stade Malien
Mauritania: ASC Nasr de Sebkha
Mauritius: Curepipe Starlight
Morocco: Olympique Khouribga
Mozambique: Costa do Sol
Namibia: Civics Windhoek
Niger: Sahel SC
Nigeria: Enyimba
Rwanda: APR
São Tomé and Príncipe:
Senegal: AS Douanes
Seychelles: Saint-Michel United
Sierra Leone: N/A 1
Somalia: Elman FC
South Africa: Mamelodi Sundowns
Sudan: Al-Hilal Omdurman
Swaziland: Royal Leopards
Tanzania: Simba SC
Togo: ASKO Kara
Tunisia: Étoile Sahel
Uganda: Uganda Revenue Authority SC
Zambia: ZESCO United
Zimbabwe: Dynamos

1 There was no national champion in Sierra Leone during 2007 as the Sierra Leone National Premier League is in the process of changing from being a summer league to a winter league; the 2006 champion will be followed by a 2007–08 champion.

AFC nations

Australia: Melbourne Victory
Bahrain: Muharraq
Bangladesh: Abahani
Bhutan: Transport United
Cambodia:
Brunei: No championship held
Burma: Kanbawza
China: Changchun Yatai
East Timor:
Guam: Quality Distributors
Hong Kong: South China
India: Dempo SC
Indonesia:
Iran: Saipa
Iraq: Arbil
Japan: Kashima Antlers
Jordan: Al-Wihdat
Kuwait: Al Kuwait
Kyrgyzstan: Dordoi-Dynamo Naryn
Laos: Lao-American College
Lebanon: Al-Ansar
Macao: GD Lam Pak
Malaysia: Kedah FA
Maldives: New Radiant
Mongolia: Erchim
Nepal: Mahendra Police Club
North Korea:
Oman: Al-Nahda
Pakistan: Pakistan Army
Philippines: National Capital Region
Qatar: Al-Sadd
Saudi Arabia: Al-Hilal
Singapore: SAFFC
South Korea: Pohang Steelers
Sri Lanka: Ratnam SC
Syria: Al-Karamah
Taiwan: Taiwan Power Company
Tajikistan: Regar-TadAZ Tursunzoda
Thailand: Chonburi
Turkmenistan: FC Aşgabat
United Arab Emirates: Al Wasl
Uzbekistan: Pakhtakor Tashkent
Vietnam: Bình Dương
Yemen: Al-Ahli

OFC nations

American Samoa: Konica
Cook Islands:
Fiji: Ba
New Caledonia: JS Baco
New Zealand: Auckland City
Niue:
Northern Mariana Islands: Fiesta Inter Saipan
Palau: Team Bangladesh
Papua New Guinea: Cancelled
Samoa:
Solomon Islands: Kossa
Tahiti: AS Manu-Ura
Tonga:
Tuvalu:
Vanuatu: Tafea

Notable managerial changes

 January 2 – Omiya Ardija appoints Robert Verbeek as their new manager to replace Toshiya Miura.
 February 2 – Huub Stevens leaves Dutch club Roda JC to coach Hamburg. He is replaced in Kerkrade by his assistant Raymond Atteveld.
 February 8 – Sparta Rotterdam names Danny Blind as their new technical director for the new season. Gert Aandewiel comes over from HFC Haarlem to replace Wiljan Vloet as the new manager of the Dutch club.
 February 15 – Dutch club FC Emmen sacks manager Jan van Dijk.
 February 17 – Manager and former international Gerald Vanenburg is sacked by Helmond Sport due to a lack of confidence, the club reports on its website.
April 10 – Fulham FC sack Chris Coleman to be replaced by Northern Ireland international manager Laurie Sanchez
 April 29 – Sam Allardyce resigns as manager of Bolton Wanderers after eight years at the club. He then takes over at Newcastle United F.C and his previous job is taken by Sammy Lee.
 May 14 – Paul Jewell resigns as Wigan Athletic manager.
 May 14 – Stuart Pearce gets sacked by Manchester City
 May 16 – Neil Warnock resigns Sheffield United job and get replaced by Bryan Robson
 June 4 – Claudio Ranieri signs as Juventus manager.
 September 20 – José Mourinho sacked as Chelsea manager
 October 22 – Greg Ryan sacked as head coach of the USA women's national team, despite 45 wins and only one loss out of 55 matches in charge. The loss, however, was a 4–0 humiliation by Brazil in the semifinals of the 2007 FIFA Women's World Cup, the worst loss in USA women's history. Ryan was also embroiled in controversy regarding his decision to bench goalkeeper Hope Solo, who had not allowed a goal in the previous three games, in favour of veteran Briana Scurry.
 October 23 – Steve Staunton sacked as Republic of Ireland head coach.
 November 8 – Ruud Gullit is signed to a three-year deal with Los Angeles Galaxy.
 November 22 – Steve McLaren sacked as England head coach.

Deaths

January
January 1 – Thierry Bacconnier (43), French footballer
January 1 – Jørgen Hammeken (88), Danish footballer
January 3 – Roland Ehrhardt (65), French footballer
January 4 – Sandro Salvadore (67), Italian footballer
January 6 – Juan Manuel Alejandrez (62), Mexican footballer
January 12 – Georg Dahlfelt (87), Danish footballer
January 12 – Roberto Mazzanti (64), Italian footballer
January 15 – David Vanole (43), American footballer
January 22 – Ramón Marsal (72), Spanish footballer
January 30 – Sixto Rojas (26), Paraguayan footballer
January 30 – Sigifredo Mercado (73), Mexican footballer
January 31 – Arben Minga (47), Albanian footballer

February
 February 4 – José Carlos Bauer, Brazilian defender, runner-up at the 1950 FIFA World Cup. (81)
 February 12 – Georg Buschner, German football player and manager. (81)

March
 March 1 – Fernando Veneranda, Italian footballer and coach
 March 19 – Menotti Avanzolini, Italian footballer

April
April 7 – Marià Gonzalvo (85), Spanish footballer
April 25 – Alan Ball (61), English footballer

May
May 2 – Juan Valdivieso (96), Peruvian footballer
May 4 – José Antonio Roca (78), Mexican footballer and coach
May 12 – Edy Vasquez (23), Honduran footballer
May 13 – Kai Johansen (66), Danish footballer
May 26 – Marek Krejčí (26), Slovak footballer

June
June 13 – Néstor Rossi (82), Argentine footballer and coach
 June 13 – Hussein Dokmak (28) and Hussein Naeem (20), two Lebanese footballers who played for Nejmeh SC died in a car bomb in Beirut
June 24 – Derek Dougan (69), Northern Irish footballer
June 26 – Jupp Derwall (80), German footballer and coach

July
July 2 – Luigi Scarabello (91), Italian footballer and coach
July 9 – Esteban Areta (75), Spanish footballer and coach
July 24 – Raimundo Pérez Lezama (84), Spanish footballer 
July 25 – Bernd Jakubowski (54), German footballer
July 27 – Giuseppe Baldo (93), Italian footballer

August
August 20 – Anton Reid (16), English footballer
August 25 – Ray Jones (18), English footballer
August 28 – Antonio Puerta (22), Spanish footballer
August 29 – Chaswe Nsofwa (28), Zambian footballer

September
 September 3 – Gustavo Eberto (24), Argentine footballer
 September 9 – Helmut Senekowitsch (73), Austrian footballer and coach
 September 11 – Ian Porterfield (61), Scottish footballer
 September 14 – Ambrogio Valadè (70), Italian footballer
 September 22 – Nílton Coelho da Costa, Brazilian striker, winner of the Panamerican Championship 1956. (79)
 September 27 – Bill Perry (77), South African footballer
 September 27 – Horst Podlasly (71), German footballer

October
October 8 – Fulvio Zuccheri (48), Italian footballer
October 26 – Nicolae Dobrin (60), Romanian footballer

November
November 5 – Nils Liedholm (85), Swedish footballer and coach
November 13 – John Doherty (footballer) (72), English footballer
November 23 – Óscar Carmelo Sánchez (36), Bolivian footballer
November 26 – Manuel Badenes (78), Spanish footballer

December
December 29 – Phil O'Donnell (35), Scottish footballer

References

 
Association football by year